Linked by Fate is a 1919 British silent drama film directed by Albert Ward and starring Isobel Elsom, Malcolm Cherry and Bernard Vaughan. It is an adaptation of the 1903 novel Linked by Fate by Charles Garvice.

Cast
 Isobel Elsom as Nina Vernon
 Malcolm Cherry as Vane Mannering
 Bernard Vaughan as Dr. Vernon
 Esme Hubbard as Polly Bamford
 Clayton Green as Julian
 Manning Haynes as Lord Sutcombe
 Elaine Inescourt as Juliet Orme
 Barbara Gott as Deborah
 Ernest A. Douglas as Reverend Fleming

References

Bibliography
 Low, Rachael. History of the British Film, 1918-1929. George Allen & Unwin, 1971.

External links

1919 films
1919 drama films
British drama films
British silent feature films
Films directed by Albert Ward
Films based on British novels
Seafaring films
British black-and-white films
1910s English-language films
1910s British films
Silent drama films
Silent adventure films